Louisville Township is one of twelve townships in Clay County, Illinois, USA.  As of the 2010 census, its population was 1,662 and it contained 758 housing units.

Geography

Cities, towns, villages
 Louisville

Unincorporated towns
 Riffle
(This list is based on USGS data and may include former settlements.)

Cemeteries
The township contains these eight cemeteries: Brown, Christian Home, Old Louisville, Orchard Hill, Red Brush, Riffle, Speaks and Tolliver.

Major highways
  US Route 45

Demographics

School districts
 North Clay Community Unit School District 25

Political districts
 Illinois' 19th congressional district
 State House District 108
 State Senate District 54

References
 
 United States Census Bureau 2007 TIGER/Line Shapefiles
 United States National Atlas

External links
 City-Data.com
 Illinois State Archives

Townships in Clay County, Illinois
Townships in Illinois
1861 establishments in Illinois